Ola Fløene (born February 1, 1969) is a Norwegian rally co-driver in the World Rally Championship. He is currently contesting WRC2 alongside long-time colleague Andreas Mikkelsen with Toksport WRT. In the past Ola has co-driven with a number of Norwegians and Swedes including Pontus Tidemand, Mads Østberg and Henning Solberg.

Rally career
Fløene's co-driving career began in the 1980s, mainly entering into Norwegian events and occasional WRC and ERC rallies through the 1990s. He gained a great deal of experience of international rallies in the new century, sitting with a number of drivers. Fløene began co-driving with a then 17-years-old Mikkelsen in 2006 on various British events, winning 6 rallies outright that year including their debut outing together. The partnership lasted for 5 further seasons beginning with a limited WRC campaign in 2007.

Together Fløene and Mikkelsen won the Intercontinental Rally Challenge in 2011 and 2012. In 2013 Mikkelsen became a factory driver with Volkswagen Motorsport sitting alongside Finn Mikko Markkula. Fløene meanwhile joined Pontus Tidemand where they became Junior World Rally champions that year.

His partnership with Mikkelsen restarted as he joined Volkswagen Motorsport himself in 2014, replacing Markkula mid-season. He got his first WRC podium on his second rally at Volkswagen and they both got their first WRC win at the 2015 Rally Catalunya.

In 2016 it was announced he would become Mads Østberg's co-driver at M-Sport whilst Anders Jæger took over from Fløene at Volkswagen. Fløene would reunite with Mikkelsen once again in 2021 to compete in WRC2 with Toksport WRT.

WRC victories

Rally results

WRC results

References

External links

 Profile at ewrc-results.com

1969 births
Living people
Norwegian rally co-drivers
World Rally Championship co-drivers
Sportspeople from Hamar
Dakar Rally co-drivers